Permian tetrapods were amphibians and reptiles that lived during the Permian Period.

During this time, amphibians remained common, including various Temnospondyli and Lepospondyli.  Synapsids became the dominant type of animal, represented by the Pelycosaurs during the Early Permian and Therapsids during the Middle and Late Permian, and distinguished by the appearance and possession of mammal-like characteristics (hence the old term "mammal-like reptiles").  These were accompanied by Anapsids or Parareptiles, which included both lizard-like and large herbivorous forms, and primitive diapsids.

Classification 
The following list of families of Permian tetrapods is based mostly on Benton ed. 1993.  The classification follows Benton 2004: 

Superclass Tetrapoda
 Class Amphibia
 Order Temnospondyli
 Family Edopidae
 Family Cochleosauridae
 Family Trimerorhachidae
 Family Dvinosauridae
 Family Saurerpetontidae
 Family Brachyopidae
 Family Actinodontidae
 Family Intasuchidae
 Family Archegosauridae
 Family Rhinesuchidae
 Family Uranocentrodontidae
 Family Zatrachydidae
 Family Eryopidae
 Family Parioxyidae
 Family Peltobatrachidae
 Family Trematopidae
 Family Dissorophidae
 Family Micromelerpetontidae
 Family Branchiosauridae
 Family Amphibamidae
 Superorder Lepospondyli
 Order Aïstopoda
 Family Phlegethontiidae
 Order Nectridea
 Family Diplocaulidae
 Family Scincosauridae
 Family Urocordylidae
 Order Lysorophia
 Family Lysorophidae
 Order Microsauria
 Family Microbrachidae
 Family Brachyslechidae
 Family Tuditanidae
 Family Hapsidopareiontidae
 Family Pantylidae
 Family Gymnarthridae
 Family Ostodolepididae
 Family Rhynchonkidae
 Family Cocytinidae

 Superorder Reptiliomorpha
 Order Anthracosauria
 Family Eogyrinidae
 Family Archeriidae
 Family Chroniosuchidae
 Family Bystrowianidae
 Order Seymouriamorpha
 Family Seymouriidae
 Family Discosauriscidae
 Family Kotlassiidae
 Orders/Suborders Uncertain
 Family Leptorophidae
 Family Enosuchidae
 Family Nycleroleridae
 Family Tokosauridae
 Family Lanthanosuchidae
 Family Tseajiidae
 Order Diadectomorpha
 Family Limnoscelididae
 Family Diadectidae
Series Amniota
 Class Sauropsida
 Subclass Anapsida
 Family Acleistorhinidae
 Family Eunotosauridae
 Family Mesosauridae
 Family Millerettidae
 Family Nyctiphruretidae
 Family Procolophonidae
 Family Pareiasauridae
 Basal Eureptilia
 Family Captorhinidae
 Family Protorothyrididae
 Subclass Diapsida
 Order Araeoscelidia
 Family Araeoscelididae
 Orders unspecified
 Family Weigeltisauridae
 Family Claudiosauridae
 Family Heleosauridae
 Order Younginiformes
 Family Acerosodontosaurus
 Family Younginidae
 Family Tangasauridae
 Family Galesphyridae
 Infraclass Lepidosauromorpha
 Family Paliguanidae
 Infraclass Archosauromorpha
  Order Prolacertiformes
 Family Protorosauridae
 Division Archosauria
 Class Synapsida
 Order Pelycosauria
 Family Eothyrididae
 Family Caseidae
 Family Varanopidae
 Family Ophiacodontidae
 Family Edaphosauridae
 Family Sphenacodontidae
 Order Therapsida
 Tetraceratops
 Suborder Biarmosuchia
 Family Phthinosuchidae
 Family Biarmosuchidae
 Family Ictidorhinidae
 Family Burnetiidae
 Family Eotitanosuchidae
 Suborder Dinocephalia
 Family Estemmenosuchidae
 Family Anteosauridae
 Family Titanosuchidae
 Family Tapinocephalidae
 Suborder Gorgonopsia
 Family Gorgonopsidae
 Suborder Anomodontia/Dicynodontia
 Family Dromasauridae
 Family Otsheriidae
 Family Galeopidae
 Family Venyukoviidae
 Family Eodicynodontidae
 Family Endothiodontidae
 Family Cryptodontidae
 Family Aulacephalodontidae
 Family Dicynodontidae
 Family Pristerodontidae
 Family Emydopidae
 Family Robertiidae
 Family Kingoriidae
 Family Pristerognathidae
 Suborder Therocephalia
 Family Hofmeyeriidae
 Family Euchambersiidae
 Family Whaitsiidae
 Family Ictidosuchidae
 Family Scaloposauridae
 Family Lycideopsidae
 Suborder Cynodontia
 Family Dviniidae
 Family Procynosuchidae
 Family Galesauridae

See also 
 List of Carboniferous tetrapods
List of Devonian tetrapods

References 

 Benton, M. J. (2004), Vertebrate Paleontology, 3rd ed. Blackwell Science Ltd
 ----- (editor), (1993) The fossil record II. London: Chapman and Hall.